La Motte-aux-Bois  is a former commune in the Nord department in northern France. It was absorbed by Morbecque some time between 1790 and 1794.

Heraldry

See also
Communes of the Nord department

References

Former communes of Nord (French department)
Villages in Hauts-de-France